Authari (c. 550 – 5 September 590) was king of the Lombards from 584 to his death. He was considered as the first Lombard king to have adopted some level of Romanitas (Roman-ness) and introduced policies that led to drastic changes, particularly in the treatment of the Romans and greater tolerance for the Christian faith.

Rule 
Authari was the son of Cleph, King of the Lombards, and duke of an unknown city. When the latter was murdered in 574, the Lombard nobility refused to appoint a successor, resulting in a ten-years-long interregnum known as the Rule of the Dukes, represented by leading regional oligarchs who held sway. 

In 574 and 575 the Lombards invaded Provence, then part of the kingdom of Burgundy of the Merovingian Guntram, but Burgundian counteroffensives pushed them across the Alps and into northern Italy, where they occupied the Susa and Aosia valleys. Meanwhile, the eastern Merovingian kingdom allied itself with the Byzantines and counter-attacked; the combined Frankish and Byzantine armies marched through the Tyrol valley of the Etsch into Meran and up to the gates of Trent. While successful at first, the Lombard Duke of Trent, Euin, was able to repulse their assaults and crushed the invaders near Salurn. Not only was Euin able to score victory but increased the Lombards' regional ties by marrying the daughter of Garibald I, duke of Bavaria in 578.

Under pressure from the Franks, who—under Byzantine employ—invaded Italy again in 584, the Lombards elected Duke Authari as their king, who defeated the intruders. When the next Frankish imposition occurred in 588, it proved a fiasco for the invading forces since both Authari's Lombards and Garibald's Bavarian forces were allied and defeated them accordingly. Additional imperial tactics of paying one barbarian group to fight another came into play when the Alemannic mercenary commander Droctulf was persuaded to abandon the Lombards and join the imperial forces in assailing his former confederates. However, Authari overcame Droctulf's forces—Authari was later celebrated for retaking Classis from the Lombards—and Droctulf retreated to Brescia and Ravenna.      

Then in 590, the Frankish envoy Grippo led another combined imperial and Frankish army against the Lombards. Their intention to drive them from Italy, but after capturing Modena, Mantua, and Altino, had to stop at the Lombard capital at Pavia upon learning that the Frankish leader Cedinus had signed a ten-month truce with King Authari, which forced them to return to Gaul. As a result of this and other debacles across the empire, Constantinople and the reestablished imperial west at Ravenna were required to come to terms with the permanent presence of the Lombards in Italy.

Religion and marriage
Despite his conversion to Arian Christianity and the toleration for the religion not permitted by his predecessors, Authari forbade the sons of Lombards from being baptized as Catholics, since he viewed it as an "instrument of the Empire" that would sap "the warrior vitality" from them. 

Authari married Theodelinda, daughter of the Bavarian duke Garibald I, on 15 May 589 at Verona. A detailed account of the courtship by the eighth-century historian Paul the Deacon revealed that the marriage was also a political alliance designed to provide additional sanction to Authari's royal position. In addition, Theodelinda was also chosen due to the long-standing ties between the Lombards and the Bavarians as well as their mutual hostility toward the Franks. She also claimed descent from the ancient Lombard royal line.

Legacy
When Authari died in Pavia in 590, possibly by poison, he was succeeded as king by Agilulf, duke of Turin, on the advice, sought by the dukes, of Theodelinda, who married the new king. In the wake of Authari's death, Theodelinda increased her cooperation with Pope Gregory the Great in what came to mark a "high-point in Lombard history" from a religious perspective, according to historian Shami Ghosh. 

Throughout the 7th century, Authari's successors continued to strengthen the Lombard monarchy and bolster their ethnic identity, while at the same time expanding the Lombard control of Italy. These successors (like Agilulf) not only extended the reach
of the Lombards but also instituted important changes in the religion and governmental structure of the Lombards.

References

Notes

Citations

Bibliography

Further reading

|-

540 births
590 deaths
Year of birth uncertain

6th-century Lombard monarchs
Lombard warriors
People from Monza
People from Brianza